Bolinas is an unincorporated coastal community and census-designated place in Marin County, California, United States. As of the 2020 census it had a population of 1,483.

The community is known for its reclusive residents. It is only accessible via unmarked roads; any road sign along State Route 1 that points the way into town has been torn down by local residents, to the point where county officials offered a ballot measure to which the voters responded by stating a preference for no more signs.

History 

Prior to the European colonization of California, the Coast Miwok lived in the area, possibly calling the area "Bali-N".

Bolinas and present-day Stinson Beach were once encompassed by Rancho Las Baulines, a Mexican land grant given by Governor Pío Pico to Gregorio Briones in 1846.

The first post office in the town of Bolinas opened in 1863.

Many of these lots were sold for $69.50 by the San Francisco Bulletin as a subscription promotion. Portions of the mesa, including sections of Ocean Parkway, have since eroded into the sea. A few streets on the mesa are paved and maintained by the county, but many are unpaved, and either maintained by adjoining property owners or completely unmaintained. The Big Mesa has no sewer system, and houses on the mesa have individual septic systems.

The Bolinas beaches were hit hard by the 1971 San Francisco Bay oil spill, with the community coming together to clean the beach of crude oil.

The Bolinas Museum was founded in 1983. Today, it contains five galleries featuring contemporary art, historical information, and works from local artists. Today, it puts on auctions and events for locals and visitors alike.

Geography 

It is bound on the northeast by Bolinas Lagoon and Kent Island, on the south by Bolinas Bay and Duxbury Point, on the southwest by the Pacific Ocean, and on the northwest by Point Reyes National Seashore. The GNIS has cited archaic alternate town-names, including "Ballenas", "Baulenas", "Baulings", and "Bawlines".

Bolinas' downtown is located on the eastern side of town along Wharf Road, which ends at Bolinas Lagoon. The downtown buildings were mostly built between 1850 and 1920. Brighton Avenue connects downtown to the south-facing Brighton Beach. In the southeast corner of town is the Little Mesa. The Big Mesa, also known as the Gridded Mesa, lies to the west, with Agate Beach at its western end.

While located just  from State Route 1, the area is not very accessible by car. The driving time from San Rafael is roughly 52 minutes, and it takes over an hour to drive to downtown San Francisco.

Bolinas lies west of the San Andreas Fault, which runs the length of Bolinas Lagoon and continues northward through Olema Valley and Tomales Bay.

Point Reyes National Seashore borders Bolinas to the northwest. Duxbury Reef State Marine Conservation Area encompasses Bolinas' western shoreline.

Climate
Bolinas experiences warm (occasionally hot) and dry summers, with some average monthly days in summer months above . According to the Köppen Climate Classification system, Bolinas has a warm-summer Mediterranean climate, abbreviated "Csb" on climate maps. Like much of the California coast, summer afternoons are often cool and windy (and sometimes foggy) as winds blow in off the ocean.

Demographics

2010
The 2010 United States Census reported that the Bolinas CDP (Census-designated place) had a population of 1,620. The racial makeup of Bolinas was 1,406 (86.8 percent) White, 27 (1.7 percent) African American, 10 (0.6 percent) Native American, 17 (1.0 percent) Asian, 14 (0.9 percent) Pacific Islander, 64 (4.0 percent) from other races, and 82 (5.1 percent) from two or more races. Hispanic or Latino of any race were 260 people (16.0 percent).

The census reported that 88.4 percent of the population lived in households and 11.6 percent lived in non-institutionalized group quarters.

There were 698 households, 144 (20.6 percent) had children under the age of 18 living in them, 259 (37.1 percent) were opposite-sex married couples living together, 54 (7.7 percent) had a female householder with no husband present, 32 (4.6 percent) had a male householder with no wife present. There were 49 (7.0 percent) unmarried opposite-sex partnerships, and nine (1.3 percent) same-sex married couples or partnerships. There were 280 households (40.1 percent) made up of individuals, and 98 (14.0 percent) had someone living alone who was 65 or older. The average household size was 2.05. There were 345 families (49.4 percent of all households); the average family size was 2.65.

The age distribution was 234 people (14.4 percent) under the age of 18, 76 people (4.7 percent) aged 18 to 24, 385 people (23.8 percent) aged 25 to 44, 642 people (39.6 percent) aged 45 to 64, and 283 people (17.5 percent) who were 65 or older. The median age was 49.3 years. For every 100 females, there were 115.1 males. For every 100 females age 18 and over, there were 113.6 males.

There were 986 housing units at an average density of 169.2 per square mile, of the occupied units 57.4 percent were owner-occupied and 42.6 percent were rented. The homeowner vacancy rate was 1.7 percent; the rental vacancy rate was 2.6 percent. 54.1 percent of the population lived in owner-occupied housing units and 34.3 percent lived in rental housing units.

2000

At the 2000 census there were 1,246 people in 486 households, including 260 families, in the CDP. The racial makeup of the CDP in 2000 was 77.7 percent non-Hispanic White, 0.5 percent non-Hispanic Black or African American, 0.2 percent Native American, 0.9 percent Asian, 0.2 percent Pacific Islander, 0.1 percent from other races, and 4.3 percent from two or more races. 16.0 percent of the population were Hispanic or Latino of any race.
Of the 486 households 27.4 percent had children under the age of 18 living with them, 39.9 percent were married couples living together, 10.5 percent had a female householder with no husband present, and 46.3 percent were non-families. Of all households, 32.1 percent were one person and 4.5 percent had someone living alone who was 65 or older. The average household size was 2.29 and the average family size was 2.87.

The age distribution was 21.0 percent under the age of 18, 4.7 percent from 18 to 24, 26.0 percent from 25 to 44, 40.3 percent from 45 to 64, and 8.0 percent who were 65 or older. The median age was 44 years. For every 100 females, there were 110.8 males. For every 100 females age 18 and over, there were 102.1 males.

The median household income was $53,188 and the median family income was $56,111.  Males had a median income of $48,281 versus $40,417 for females. The per capita income for the CDP was $28,973. About 5.5% of families and 10.2 percent of the population were below the poverty line, including 6.7 percent of those under age 18 and 2.8 percent of those age 65 or over.

The much larger area defined by the Census Bureau as Zip Code Tabulation Area 94924, which includes Horseshoe Hill, Dogtown, and Five Brooks, had a 2000 population of 1,560 people (see map).

Education
Bolinas is in the Bolinas-Stinson Union School District, the Tamalpais Union High School District, and the Marin Community College District. Students in primary grades (kindergarten – grade 2) attend Stinson Beach School, while elementary grade students (grades 3–8) attend Bolinas School. Bolinas is included in the attendance area of Tamalpais High School, in Mill Valley.

In 1951, Ford Times identified Bolinas as the first in its series of "Tom Sawyer Towns... a good place for boys and girls to live and grow... its school days, its summer vacations, its vast adventures in fishing, swimming, baseball, basking and dreaming in the sun. Such a place is Bolinas."

Government

Bolinas is unincorporated, receiving general government services from Marin County, including law enforcement, land use planning, public health, and code enforcement. Two special districts provide local services. The Bolinas Community Public Utility District provides water and wastewater service and contracts for garbage and recycling collection. The Bolinas Fire Protection District provides fire protection, emergency medical care, and disaster management services.

Bolinas Community Public Utility District
In 1967, the Bolinas Community Public Utility District was formed by the Marin County Board of Supervisors. It merged two local water districts, the Bolinas Beach Public Utility District which served the Big Mesa, and the Bolinas Public Utility District which served the Downtown and Little Mesa, with the Marin County Sanitary District #3, formed in 1908 to provide sewer service in the downtown. The BCPUD provides water service and solid waste pickup throughout Bolinas, and sewer service to the Downtown and Little Mesa.

In November 1971, the Bolinas Community Public Utility District instituted a moratorium on new water permits, which halted the construction of new homes. The moratorium was based on the limited local water supply during the summer months and in drought years, and also serves to limit new development in Bolinas. In 1990, the BCPUD enacted a moratorium on new sewer connections, to address the limited capacity of the sewage collection system. Many lots, especially on the Big Mesa, remain undeveloped.

In 2003, Bolinas voters adopted Measure G, authored by Bolinas artist Jane "Dakar" Blethen. The advisory measure called for the following language to be adopted as a policy of the Bolinas Community Public Utility District:

Regional recreation and marine protected areas
Besides the public access beach near the downtown area, there is a county park, Agate Beach, which contains extensive tide pools that are protected as part of the Gulf of the Farallones National Marine Sanctuary. The town also hosts the Marin-Bolinas Botanical Gardens, and borders on the Point Reyes National Seashore to the north. Alamere Falls, one of only two beach waterfalls in the continental U.S., is on the California Coastal Trail from Palomarin Trailhead at the end of Mesa Road.

Duxbury Reef State Marine Conservation Area lies offshore from Bolinas.  Like an underwater park, this marine protected area helps conserve ocean wildlife and marine ecosystems.

In popular culture
Bolinas and its reclusive reputation are featured in the 1981 novel Ecotopia Emerging by Ernest Callenbach.

Wildflowers, a 1999 film starring Daryl Hannah, was partly filmed in Bolinas.

Stickers that say "Radio Free Bolinas" were subtly put on a couple of the Y-wing pilot helmets seen in Return of the Jedi. Radio Free Bolinas was a pirate radio station that was founded in 1978, and was shut down by the FCC sometime after the station had a call from San Francisco, over 10 miles away and out of their broadcast range. This sticker was put on by the prop makers as they were likely in or around the area listening to the station while making the helmets.

Notable people

References

Further reading

External links
Bolinas Beach from the air, 2005 (California Coastal Records Project)
Bolinas Library
Bolinas Community Land Trust (BCLT) (Affordable, community housing, preserving the human ecosystem, and the natural ecology of Bolinas.)
Bolinas Museum
The Coastal Post
Bolinas Community Center
New York Times article on Bolinas Culture
Bolinas Literary History by Kevin Opstedal
Dreaming As One: Poetry, Poets and Community in Bolinas, California, 1967-1980 by Kevin Opstedal

 
Populated coastal places in California
Unincorporated communities in California
Census-designated places in Marin County, California
Census-designated places in California
West Marin
Artist colonies